American singer Lady Gaga has released three video albums and has been featured in over thirty music videos. From her debut album The Fame (2008), she released music videos for the singles "Just Dance", "Poker Face", "Eh, Eh", "LoveGame", and "Paparazzi". In the latter, she portrays a doomed starlet taking revenge on her lover. She also shot a video for the album's promotional single "Beautiful, Dirty, Rich". She reissued her first album as The Fame Monster (2009), preceded by a music video for the lead single "Bad Romance", which won a Grammy Award for Best Music Video and seven MTV Video Music Awards, including Video of the Year in 2010. The following year, Jonas Åkerlund directed the music video for "Telephone"—a continuation of "Paparazzi"—which was shot as a short film. The video received an MTV Video Music Award for Video of the Year nomination, and was named the Best Music Video of the Decade by Billboard in January 2015. For her 2010 video "Alejandro", Gaga received positive reviews from critics, though she was criticized by the Catholic League that alleged blasphemy.

Gaga's second studio album Born This Way (2011) released the music video for the eponymous lead single, in which she gives birth to a new race. The music video won the Best Female Video and Best Video with a Social Message awards at the 2011 MTV Video Music Awards. In the following video, "Judas", she portrays Mary Magdalene, and Norman Reedus plays the title role. The video for "The Edge of Glory" consists mostly of interchanging shots of Gaga dancing and singing on the street and was considered the simplest of her career. In the same year, she released "You and I", which focuses on her trying to get her boyfriend back in Nebraska. She also introduces her male alter ego Jo Calderone in the video. Gaga directed her 14-minute video for the final single "Marry the Night", which narrates her story to find success in the music industry, but she ultimately suffers setback.

In 2013, Gaga released her third album Artpop, with "Applause" as its lead single, whose music video includes artistic and complex scenes. The 11-minute video for "G.U.Y." was filmed at the Hearst Castle, and features cameos from Andy Cohen and The Real Housewives of Beverly Hills stars. In 2014, Gaga released a jazz album with Tony Bennett called Cheek to Cheek, which generated four studio videos showing the album's recording process. In 2015, she released the music video for "Til It Happens to You", a song about campus rape in the United States. Her fifth studio album, Joanne, was released in 2016, and the music video for its lead single, "Perfect Illusion", was shot in the desert with a story that continues in her subsequent videos "Million Reasons", "John Wayne", and "Joanne". Gaga's sixth studio album Chromatica (2020) spawned the music video for the lead single "Stupid Love", followed by "Rain on Me", which features Ariana Grande. She also released a short film for "911", which focuses on a variety of surreal hallucination she has after getting involved in a serious car accident. As part of Love for Sales (2021) promotion, Gaga and Bennett released many studio videos shot during recording sessions of each song.

Gaga has appeared in television shows, including in guest judging roles in American Idol and So You Think You Can Dance, as well as starring in an episode of The Simpsons. She is also featured in several movies and commercials, and has held two Thanksgiving television specials—A Very Gaga Thanksgiving (2011) and Lady Gaga and the Muppets Holiday Spectacular (2013). Gaga starred in the fifth season of the horror anthology series American Horror Story, entitled Hotel (2015–2016), for which she won a Golden Globe Award for Best Actress – Miniseries or Television Film. She also appeared in its sixth season, entitled Roanoke (2016). Gaga was later the focus of the 2017 documentary Gaga: Five Foot Two, which explored the creation of Joanne and her preparation for the Super Bowl LI halftime show. She went onto star as a singer named Ally in the successful musical romantic drama A Star Is Born (2018) alongside Bradley Cooper. For her work, Gaga was nominated for an Academy Award, a BAFTA Award, a Golden Globe Award and a Screen Actors Guild Award for Best Actress, while winning the Critics' Choice and National Board of Review awards. Her second leading role was in the biographical crime film House of Gucci, released in 2021. Gaga will co-star in Joker: Folie à Deux, which is scheduled for release on October 4, 2024.

Music videos

Video albums

Filmography

Film

Television

Commercials

Web

Notes

References

Footnotes

Sources

External links 
 Lady Gaga's official Vevo channel on YouTube
 [ Discography and videography of Lady Gaga] at Allmusic

Actress filmographies
Lady Gaga
Videographies of American artists
American filmographies